The Paech'ŏn Line is a partially electrified standard-gauge secondary railway line of the Korean State Railway in South Hwanghae Province, North Korea, running from Changbang on the Hwanghae Ch'ŏngnyŏn Line to Ŭnbit.

History
By the end of 1930, the Chosen Railway (abbreviated Chōtetsu), the largest privately owned railway in colonial Korea, had extended its Hwanghae Line network to run from Sariwŏn to Sugyo in the west and to Haeju in the south, completing the latter line in December of that year. Chōtetsu then began building eastwards from Haeju to create a southern connection to the Kyŏngŭi Line, the state-owned Chosen Government Railway's (abbreviated Sentetsu) mainline from Kyŏngsŏng to Sinŭiju and Andong, Manchuria, opening the first section of a new  narrow-gauge line, from East Haeju to Yŏn'an, on 21 December 1931. The second section was opened on 1 September 1932, running from Yŏn'an across the Ryesong River to connect to the Kyŏngŭi Line at Tosŏng (later renamed Kaep'ung). A  extension west from East Haeju to Haeju was opened on 1 July 1933.

Chōtetsu sold the Hwanghae Line network to Sentetsu on 1 April 1944, which absorbed the split the network into separate lines, with the Haeju—Tosŏng line becoming known as the Tohae Line.

Following the end of the Pacific War and the subsequent partition of Korea, most of the Tohae Line was located in the US zone of occupation that later became South Korea, with the line being divided along the 38th Parallel between Changbang and Kalsan, and the Korean National Railroad operated passenger trains on the line between Tosŏng and Ch'ŏngdan until 1950. The line was heavily damaged during the Korean War, and the destruction of the Ryesong River bridge left the line truncated at Paech'ŏn. The truncated line ended up in North Korea after the Korean Armistice, becoming part of the Korean State Railway which gave the line its current name of Paech'ŏn Line. The Korean State Railway completed the conversion of the Haeju—Paech'ŏn line to standard gauge in 1971, at the same time adding an extension from Paech'ŏn to the current terminus, Ŭnbit.

Electrification of the section from Changbang to Ch'ŏngdan was completed by April 1982.

Route
A yellow background in the "Distance" box indicates that section of the line is not electrified.

Tŏktal Line

Opened in 1931 by Chōtetsu. Not electrified; closed.

References

Railway lines in North Korea
Standard gauge railways in North Korea